Borodianka is a suburb of Bucha, Kyiv Oblast, Ukraine.

Borodianka or Borodyanka or Borodzianka may also refer to:

Places
 Borodianka Raion, a former raion of Kyiv Oblast, Ukraine
 Borodyanka (4577), an telephone area code in Bucha, Kyiv, Ukraine; see List of dialling codes in Ukraine
 Borodianka (air base), Borodianka, Kyiv, Ukraine; a former Cold War air base
 Borodianka rail station; see List of railway stations in Ukraine

Other uses
 Battle of Borodzianka (1920), during the Polish-Soviet War
 Occupation of Borodianka (2022), during the Russian invasion of Ukraine; see War crimes in the 2022 Russian invasion of Ukraine

See also

 
 
 
 1995 Borodianka mid-air collision, between an An-70 and An-72 during a flight test
 Flag of Borodianka; see Flags of populated places of Ukraine